Annie Bernadette Kersting is chemist known for her work on the movement of compounds such as plutonium in the environment. She was the 2016 recipient of the Garvan–Olin Medal from the American Chemical Society.

Education and career 
Kersting has a B.A. from the University of California, Berkeley (1983) and an M.S. from the University of Michigan, Ann Arbor (1987). In 1991 she earned her Ph.D. from the University of Michigan working on petrology and geochemistry of a volcano in Kamchatka.

Research 
Kersting is known for her work on the movement of plutonium and related compounds in the environment. In 1999 Kersting was the first to show that the movement of plutonium can occur on small particles, research that was based on the presence of plutonium downstream from Nevada Test Site.

Selected publications

Awards and honors 
In 2016 Kersting received the Garvan-Olin medal from the American Chemical Society; she was cited for "For seminal contributions to understanding radionuclide behavior in the environment, mentoring students and postdocs, and developing successful education programs in nuclear forensics and environmental radiochemistry".

References

External links 

 

Living people
University of California, Berkeley alumni
University of Michigan alumni
21st-century American chemists
Women chemists
Inorganic chemists
Year of birth missing (living people)